In mathematics, the additive identity of a set that is equipped with the operation of addition is an element which, when added to any element  in the set, yields . One of the most familiar additive identities is the number 0 from elementary mathematics, but additive identities occur in other mathematical structures where addition is defined, such as in groups and rings.

Elementary examples
 The additive identity familiar from elementary mathematics is zero, denoted 0. For example,

 In the natural numbers  (if 0 is included), the integers  the rational numbers  the real numbers  and the complex numbers  the additive identity is 0.  This says that for a number  belonging to any of these sets,

Formal definition
Let  be a group that is closed under the operation of addition, denoted +.

Further examples
 In a group, the additive identity is the identity element of the group, is often denoted 0, and is unique (see below for proof).
 A ring or field is a group under the operation of addition and thus these also have a unique additive identity 0. This is defined to be different from the multiplicative identity 1 if the ring (or field) has more than one element. If the additive identity and the multiplicative identity are the same, then the ring is trivial (proved below).
For example, in the 2×2 matrices over the integers  the additive identity is

In the quaternions, 0 is the additive identity.
In the additive group of vectors in  the origin or zero vector is the additive identity.

Properties

The additive identity is unique in a group

It then follows from the above that

The additive identity annihilates ring elements
This follows because:

The additive and multiplicative identities are different in a non-trivial ring
Let  be a ring and suppose that the additive identity 0 and the multiplicative identity 1 are equal, i.e. 0 = 1. Then

proving that  is trivial, i.e.  The contrapositive, that if  is non-trivial then 0 is not equal to 1, is therefore shown.

See also
0 (number)
Additive inverse
Identity element
Multiplicative identity

References

Bibliography 
David S. Dummit, Richard M. Foote, Abstract Algebra, Wiley (3rd ed.): 2003, .

External links

Abstract algebra
Elementary algebra
Group theory
Ring theory
0 (number)